The Meditation Chapel is located in Salt Lake City's Memory Grove, in the U.S. state of Utah. The structure was built by Mr. and Mrs. Ross Beason in 1948 to commemorate their son and others killed during World War II. It is made of Georgian marble, a copper roof, and bronze doors. The Memory Grove Foundation restored the chapel's stained glass windows, earning the group a Utah Heritage Foundation Heritage Award in 1999.

References

External links

 

Buildings and structures in Salt Lake City
Monuments and memorials in Utah
World War II memorials in the United States